was a town located in Nita District, Shimane Prefecture, Japan.

As of 2003, the town had an estimated population of 8,507 and a density of 47.62 persons per km². The total area was 178.64 km².

On January 31, 2005, Nita, along with the town of Yokota (also from Nita District), was merged to create the town of Okuizumo.

Dissolved municipalities of Shimane Prefecture